Mac Stanton (born 1977) is an electronic music producer and the creator and manager of So French Records. Stanton is also part of the three-man (Stanton, Boss & Player) music group Freshlovers.

Musical career 

Stanton started producing at the age of 18. Stanton produces the "French Touch" style of house music.

In December 2008, Stanton created the So French Records record label. So French Records saw its first release in the Beverly Hills Chase EP by the Freshlovers. Beverly Hills Chase was remixed by a number of notable groups, including Superfunk, Super Mal, Jetset Hifi, Edwin Van Cleef, 4TrakZ, Vch Crew, Super 64, and Vox Populis.

Stanton has been featured on the music website In Your Speakers, describing him as an "up-and-coming Daft Punk protégé".

In February 2012, Stanton released his first album called A nos amours LP on So French Records, an album containing 17 tracks.

Stanton's album L'Odyssée was released in May 2017 on So French Records.

Stanton's new album L'Odyssée Live was released in June 2018 on So French Records.

Mac Stanton released his third studio album Awesome in February 2020 on So French Records.

Discography

See also 

House music
Electro house
Progressive house
French house
Eurodance
Euro disco
Daft Punk
Electronic music

References

External links 

Official Mac Stanton Facebook page
Official Mac Stanton Soundcloud page
Official Freshlovers Soundcloud page
Official Freshlovers Facebook Page
Official Freshlovers Myspace
Official So French Records Facebook Page
Official So French Records Myspace
So French Records

French electronic musicians
French house musicians
1977 births
Living people